Finding Ohana is a 2021 American family adventure film by Jude Weng in her directorial debut and written by Christina Strain, based on the 1985 feature film The Goonies by Richard Donner, Steven Spielberg, and Chris Columbus. The film stars Kea Peahu, Alex Aiono, Lindsay Watson, Owen Vaccaro and Kelly Hu. It premiered on Netflix on January 29, 2021.

Plot
New York–raised Hawaiian siblings Pili and Ioane "E" temporarily relocate from New York to Oahu with their mother Leilani to help her father, Kimo, whose health and financial issues are becoming serious. Pili is an avid geocaching fan, and her malaise at being separated from her beloved New York is assuaged by secretly liberating an old diary from her grandfather's art studio. Meanwhile, E is distracted from his own search for better Internet signal by the requisite pretty local girl, Hana, who has big dreams of her own. The siblings find themselves learning about their Hawaiian heritage as Pili goes on a Goonies-style quest for lost pirate treasure. Pili is aided on her quest by local boy Casper, a nerdy but resourceful boy with a big heart, and joined by E and Hana.

Cast

 Kea Peahu as Pili
 Alex Aiono as Ioane
 Lindsay Watson as Hana
 Owen Vaccaro as Casper
 Kelly Hu as Leilani
 Branscombe Richmond as Kimo
 Ke Huy Quan as Kioki
 Brad Kalilimoku as Kua Kawena
 Chris Parnell as Brown
 Marc Evan Jackson as Robinson
 Ricky Garcia as Monks
 Ryan Higa as Ryan
 Mapuana Makia as Nurse Tina
 X Mayo as Melody
 Kyndra Sanchez as Yoli Greenburg

Production
In September 2019, it was announced Netflix had picked up the rights to Jude Weng feature film debut. Christina Strain would write, with the film being "a Goonies-esque adventure movie starring mostly Datas". Ian Bryce of Ian Bryce Productions would produce the film with Irene Yeung and JJ Hook executive producing and Katie Malott associate producing. Kea Peahu and Alex Aiono would star as the two main siblings with Marc Evan Jackson, Lindsay Watson, Owen Vaccaro, Kelly Hu, Ricky Garcia, Ryan Higa, Mapuana Makia, Brad Kalilimoku, X Mayo, and Kyndra Sanchez in the ensemble cast, as well as original The Goonies star Ke Huy Quan.

Finding Ohana was shot in Brooklyn, Hawaii, Thailand, and in the Dominican Republic.

Reception
On review aggregator Rotten Tomatoes, the film holds an approval rating of 82% based on 22 critic reviews, with an average rating of 6.90/10. According to Metacritic, which sampled seven critics and calculated a weighted average score of 69 out of 100, the film received "generally favorable reviews".

References

External links
 
 
 

2021 films
2021 directorial debut films
2021 adventure films
American adventure films
English-language Netflix original films
Films set in Hawaii
Films scored by Joseph Trapanese
Films shot in New York City
Films shot in Hawaii
Films shot in the Dominican Republic
Films shot in Thailand
Films produced by Ian Bryce
2020s English-language films
2020s American films
The Goonies